Court of Exchequer may refer to:

Exchequer of Pleas, an ancient English court that ceased to exist independently in the late nineteenth century
Court of Exchequer Chamber, an ancient English appellate court that ceased to exist independently in the late nineteenth century
Court of Exchequer (Ireland)
Court of Exchequer (Scotland), an ancient Scottish Court